Versed is a book of poetry written by Rae Armantrout and published by Wesleyan University Press in 2009 (see 2009 in poetry).  It won the 2009 National Book Critics Circle Award for Poetry and the 2010 Pulitzer Prize for Poetry after being named a finalist for the National Book Award. Armantrout is only the third poet to win two out of these three awards in one year.

Awards
As part of a lead-in to their awards announcement, NBCC board member James Marcus called Versed a collection of "vigilant, often beautiful poems [that] seem to reset the reader’s mental instrumentation—what Armantrout calls the 'whirligig / of attention, / the figuring and / reconfiguring / of charges / among orbits / (obits) / that has taken forever.'"

According to the Pulitzer Prize Board, Versed is a "book striking for its wit and linguistic inventiveness, offering poems that are often little thought-bombs detonating in the mind long after the first reading."

References

External links
Versed from Wesleyan University Press
Author/Poet Rae Armantrout 10/17/09 from YouTube, reading from Versed at Litquake PubCrawl, San Francisco

2009 poetry books
American poetry collections
Pulitzer Prize for Poetry-winning works
National Book Critics Circle Award-winning works
Wesleyan University Press books